This is a list of programs that are currently being broadcast by Nickelodeon Pakistan. Most programs are aired in English and some in Urdu.

Current shows

Original shows

Animated

 The Adventures of Kid Danger
 SpongeBob SquarePants 
 Teenage Mutant Ninja Turtles
 Alvinnn!!! and the Chipmunks
 Lego City Adventures
 Monsters vs. Aliens

Live action

 Big Time Rush
 House of Anubis
 Henry Danger
 iCarly
 The Haunted Hathaways
 The Thundermans
 Power Rangers Samurai

Acquired shows

 Pakdam Pakdai
 Oggy and the Cockroaches

Nick Jr.

 Bubble Guppies 
 Dora the Explorer
Go, Diego, Go!
 Blaze and the Monster Machines
 Shimmer and Shine
 Oobi
 Paw Patrol 
 Team Umizoomi
 Top Wing
 Wonder Pets!

Former shows

Live action

 All Grown Up!
 Allegra's Window
 Avatar: The Last Airbender
 As Told by Ginger
 Back at the Barnyard
 Blue's Clues
 Breadwinners
 Brothers Garcia
 Burka Avenger
 CatDog
 Catscratch
 ChalkZone
 Danny Phantom
 Drake and Josh
 El Tigre: The Adventures of Manny Rivera
 Engie Benjy
 Every Witch Way
 Fanboy and Chum Chum
 Fetch the Vet
 Global Guts
 Hey Arnold!
 Invader Zim
 J Bole Toh Jadoo
 Kappa Mikey
 Keymon Ache
 Kenan and Kel
 Kung Fu Panda: Legends of Awesomeness
 LazyTown
 The Mighty B!
 Monsuno
 Motu Patlu
 My Life as a Teenage Robot
 Nella the Princess Knight
 Nicky, Ricky, Dicky & Dawn
 The Fairly OddParents
 The Naked Brothers Band
 Pick a Trick
 Planet Sheen
 Rocket Monkeys
 Rocket Power
 Rugrats
 Rusty Rivets
 Shaktimaan: The Animated Series
 Supah Ninjas
 Tak and the Power of Juju
 The Adventures of Jimmy Neutron: Boy Genius
 The Penguins of Madagascar
 The Troop
 The Wild Thornberrys
 The Legend of Korra
 The X's
 True Jackson, VP
 T.U.F.F. Puppy
 Unfabulous
 Victorious
 Winx Club

Animated series

Awards

Nickelodeon Kids Choice Awards
2008 Kids' Choice Awards
2009 Kids' Choice Awards
2011 Kids' Choice Awards
2012 Kids' Choice Awards
2013 Kids' Choice Awards
2014 Kids' Choice Awards
2015 Kids' Choice Awards

References

Nickelodeon Pakistan
Nickelodeon
Pakistan